Nikki and the Corvettes is the sole studio album by American Nikki & The Corvettes, released in 1980 by record label Bomp!.

References

External links 

 

1980 debut albums